The 1910 Wake Forest Baptists football team was an American football team that represented Wake Forest College as an independent during the 1910 college football season. In its first and only season under head coach Reddy Rowe, the team compiled a 2–7 record (0–5 in intercollegiate games) and was shut out in five of its nine games.  The team played its home games in Wake Forest, North Carolina.

Schedule

References

Wake Forest
Wake Forest Demon Deacons football seasons
Wake Forest Baptists football